Charles Lambert Ferdinands was the 1st Solicitor General of Ceylon. He was appointed on 1884, and held the office until 1888. He was succeeded by Charles Layard.

References

F